Shootout at Wadala is a 2013 Indian Hindi-language biographical-gangster-crime film written and directed by Sanjay Gupta. The film stars John Abraham, Anil Kapoor, Kangana Ranaut, Tusshar Kapoor, Manoj Bajpayee and Sonu Sood. It is a prequel to the 2007 film Shootout at Lokhandwala.

Based on the book Dongri to Dubai: Six Decades of the Mumbai Mafia by Hussain Zaidi, the film dramatises the encounter by Bombay police in which gangster Manya Surve was shot dead. It took place at the junction adjacent to Dr. Ambedkar College, Wadala, Bombay on 11 January 1982. Shootout at Wadala was released on 1 May 2013 and became a box-office success, earning  worldwide.

Plot
In a police van, Afaaque Baagwan listens to the story narrated by a gangster, Manya Surve, who is gravely injured with a bullet-riddled body.

Manya Surve is a decent student at Kirti college, Dadar. He is in love with Vidya Joshi and takes her to his mother to discuss their marriage.

Manya has an older brother named Bhargav Surve, who is a mawali (rowdy). Bhargav is in conflict with an underworld don named Bhatkar and is currently on the run.
Soon enough, Bhargav is attacked and beaten up by Bhatkar's goons. Manya steps in to save him. While Manya Surve clutches one of the goons, Bhargav stabs the goon, and he dies on the spot.

On the day of Manya's exam results, before he can discover his grades, Manya and his brother are arrested, and Manya is publicly humiliated at college by Inspector Ambolkar and end up in Yerwada Central Jail. In prison, another convict named Munir saves Manya from being attacked by a goon named Potya during lunch time. During this assault, Bhargav is killed. Munir befriends Manya and another convict named Veera. Veera trains Manya to become stronger. Manya trains and then eventually is challenged by Potya. Potya attacks him from behind and beats Manya up, to which Manya responds by stabbing Potya to death.

Later on, both Manya and Munir escape from prison while they are working on a railway track and try to join hands with two brothers who rule Mumbai's deals. The first brother, Zubair Imtiaz Haksar, is cool and is impressed by Manya. However, the second brother, Dilawar, disapproves of Manya and dislikes him. After this, Manya forms his own gang, which consists of him, Munir, Veera, and Gyancho, a sharpshooter brought by Munir. Soon enough, Manya finishes off Bhatkar (the gangster who had him and his brother arrested). Jamal, Bhatkar's bodyguard, also joins them. Next, Manya brings Ambolkar to his knees by beating him brutally in public. The story next shows the death of Sadiq, an unscrupulous news reporter, by Mastan. This breaks a fight between the Haskar brothers and Mastan. Due to this, a truce is called by Haji Maqsood. The truce is short lived as Maqsood asks Manya Surve to finish Zubair. After Zubair's assassination, Dilawar kills Gyancho with the help of Jamal. He is about to kill Munir when Manya saves him. Later, Afaaque is asked to kill Manya by Dilawar. Even after his refusal, at first, he agrees when the police commissioner orders him to. The story comes to an end after the shootout and Manya's killing by police.

Cast

 John Abraham as Criminal Manya Surve
 Anil Kapoor as ACP Afaaque Baaghran (the character based on Isaque Bagwan)
 Kangana Ranaut as Vidya Joshi
 Tusshar Kapoor as Sheikh Munir
 Manoj Bajpayee as Zubair Imtiaz Haksar (the character based on Shabir Ibrahim Kaskar)
 Sonu Sood as Dilawar Imtiaz Haksar (the character based on Dawood Ibrahim Kaskar)
 Akbar Khan as Haji Maqsood (character based on Haji Mastan) (cameo)
 Ronit Roy as Inspector Raja Ambat (the character based on Raja Tambat)
 Mahesh Manjrekar as Inspector Bhinde (the character based on Madhukar Shinde)
 Siddhanth Kapoor as Gyancho (the character based on Vishnu Patil)
 Ranjeet as Bhatkar Dada
 Jackie Shroff as Police Commissioner (fictional) (cameo)
 Raju Kher as Inspector Ambolkar (the character based on Inspector E. S. Dabholkar)
 Arif Zakaria as Sadiq (news reporter) (character based on Iqbal Naatiq)
 Raju Mavani as Yakub Lala (the character based on Ayub Lala)
 Chetan Hansraj as Potya (the character based on Suhas Bhatkar)
 Karan Patel as Jamal (Bhatkar's bodyguard) (fictional)
 Sanjeev Chadda as Veera (the character based on Uday Shetty)
 Vineet Sharma as Bhargav Surve
 Pankaj Kalra as Saeed Batla
 Shaji Chaudhary as Aurangzeb Mastan

Special appearances
 Sunny Leone as Laila in the item number "Laila" (role inspired from Zubair's girlfriend Chitra)
 Priyanka Chopra in the item number "Babli Badmaash".
 Sophie Choudry in the item number "Aala Re Aala"

Controversy
Director Sanjay Gupta knew the consequences of using Dawood Ibrahim's real name while shooting the film, but he carried on with Sonu Sood being addressed as "Dilawar Imtiaz" in the film. On 27 January 2013, Balaji Motion Pictures uploaded a new version of the theatrical trailer, and trimmed nearly every dialogue from the film off. The character of Dawood Ibrahim is only seen for three seconds in the new trailer, to avoid any problems. Also, the character names have been changed as well, except for Abraham's character, whose name remains the same in the film.

Soundtrack

The music of Shootout at Wadala is composed by Anu Malik, Anand Raj Anand, Meet Bros Anjjan and Mustafa Zahid. Anu Malik was asked to compose for three songs for this film which were chartbusters.

Track listing

Critical reception
The film received a mixed reception from critics and audiences.
The ratings for the film provided by the reviewers have been tabulated. Below the table lies a collection of excerpts from the reviews, which can be matched to the respective rating as given in the table by seeing the source.

Box office

India
Shootout at Wadala had an opening of around 65% occupancy and went on to collect  on first day.
The two-week domestic distributor share is  255.0 million approx. The final total came out to be .

Overseas
Shootout at Wadala collected $900,000 over its first weekend. Its final overseas collection was US$1.625 million.

Budget and marketing

Pre-release business
Shootout at Wadala was released in 2013 in theaters across the country through AA Films.

 These figures do not include Print and Advertising (P&A) costs.

Sequel
Director Sanjay Gupta has stated his plans to make the third installment to the franchise, Shootout at Byculla. He has also said that he will restart his movie Alibaug, starring Sunny Deol, and turn it into the third sequel of the Shootout film series. Also, actors Abhishek Bachchan and John Abraham have been rumoured to star alongside each other. Abraham will portray a real encounter specialist Vijay Salaskar. The project is currently untitled, but it has been reported to be an "epic revenge saga".

References

External links

 
 Shootout at Wadala at Bollywood Hungama

2010s biographical films
2013 crime action films
2013 films
Films about organised crime in India
Indian films based on actual events
Films set in Mumbai
Films set in 1982
2010s Hindi-language films
Indian biographical films
2013 masala films
Films scored by Anu Malik
Biographical films about gangsters
Fictional portrayals of the Maharashtra Police
Indian gangster films
Balaji Motion Pictures films
Action films based on actual events
Films based on Indian novels
Indian crime action films
Biographical action films
Indian historical action films
Films directed by Sanjay Gupta
D-Company
Indian prequel films